Liepas was an air base located  south of Valmiera, a city in Latvia. It was a Soviet attack deployment base during the Cold War.

Valmiera
Latvian airbases
Soviet Air Force bases